Rathen railway station was a railway station in Rathen, Aberdeenshire, on the defunct Formartine and Buchan Railway in northeast Scotland.

History 
The station was opened on 24 April 1865 by the Formartine and Buchan Railway. It had a signal box in 1894, although it closed quickly and was reduced to a ground frame. The station building was on the west side and on the east side was the goods yard. The station closed on 4 October 1965.

References

Disused railway stations in Aberdeenshire
Beeching closures in Scotland
Former Great North of Scotland Railway stations
Railway stations in Great Britain opened in 1865
Railway stations in Great Britain closed in 1965
1865 establishments in Scotland
1965 disestablishments in Scotland